Zirka Menzatyuk is a Ukrainian children's book author and journalist; from 1995 the Member of National Writers' Union of Ukraine. She lives and works in Kyiv.

Biography 

She was born in 1954 in Mamajivzi in the Chernivtsi oblast.

After winning first place at the regional Olympics for Ukrainian language and literature, she was able to study journalism at the Ivan Franko University of Lviv from 1972 to 1977 on the recommendation of the Writers’ Union. After graduation she worked as a correspondent for various Soviet-Ukrainian newspapers in the region and nationwide. Dissatisfied with the situation of false reporting, she gave up her journalism career and as of 1988 devoted herself to writing literary texts.

Writer career 

The first fairy tale book of the author was published in 1990 under the title "Тисяча парасольок" (A Thousand Umbrellas).

Her second book "Арніка" (Arnica, 1993) is a story about a Carpathian magic potion.

After the Ukrainian book market crisis, during which Zirka Menzatyuk published her texts in magazines, a book about famous churches and monasteries in Ukraine was published in 2002.

Zirka Menzatyuk also published a book entitled "Київські казки" (Kyiv Stories, 2006) about Kyiv and its fairy-tale aspects with heroes such as the sorceress Dobrada. In the same year, one of her the most famous book "Таємниця козацької шаблі" (The Mystery of the Cossack Sabre) was published.

The writer cooperates with top Ukrainian publishers: A-ba-ba-ha-la-ma-ha, VSL, Bukrek, Ranok etc.

Recognition 

The books of Zirka Menzatyuk have been published in Ukraine and in the United States, and have been awarded the Lesia Ukrainka Prize (2007). She has received prizes in Slovakia and Poland, won the US International Literary Competition, and was awarded the Natali Zabila Literary Prize for her work (2005).

Books 
 Тисяча парасольок. Казки.- К.: «Веселка», 1990
 Арніка. Казка.- К.: «Веселка», 1993
 Оповідання з історії Києва. Підручник для 5 класу загальноосвітньої школи.- К.: «Гранд», 1998
 Мільйон мільйонів сестричок. Казки.- К.: «Лелека», 1999
 Наші церкви: історія, дива, легенди. Нариси для дітей середнього шкільного віку.- К.: «Соняшник», 2002
 Київські казки.- Львів: «Видавництво Старого Лева», 2006
 Kyiv Stories. Переклад Оксани Луцишиної.- Львів: «Видавництво Старого Лева», 2006
 Казочки-куцохвостики.- Львів: «Видавництво Старого Лева», 2006
 Таємниця козацької шаблі. Пригодницька повість.- Львів: «Видавництво Старого Лева», 2006
 Катрусині скарби. Оповідання,-Чернівці: «Букрек», 2007
 Як до жабок говорити. Казки.- К.: «Грані-Т», 2007
 Макове князювання. Казки.- К.: «Школа», 2008
 Український квітник. Есе.- К.: «Грані-Т», 2010, 2011
 Дочка Троянди. Драма-казка.- Острог: «Острозька академія», 2012
 Зварю тобі борщику. Казки.- Львів: «Видавництво Старого Лева», 2012
 Зелені чари. Нариси.- Чернівці, «Букрек», 2012
 Arnica. Переклад на англійську мову Стівена Кента і Віри Міченер. Електронне видання amazon.com (США), 2013.
 Як я руйнувала імперію.- Л.: «Видавництво Старого Лева», 2014
 Чарівні слова. Казочки про мову. — Чернівці: «Букрек», 2016
 Київські казки — Ранок , 2017
 Дике літо в Криму — Абабагаламага, 2018
 Ангел Золоте волосся, 2019
 Величні собори України: нариси для допитливих.- Чернівці: «Букрек», 2020

References

Sources and external links 
 Мензатюк Zirka Menzatyuk on VIIth International Literature Odessa Festival website
 Коли Зірка стає світлішою // Україна молода, № 200, 28.10.2009
 Zirka Menzatyuk on National Writers' Union of Ukraine
  Зірка Мензатюк: «Мої казки можуть читати і мами, і бабусі» // Високий Замок
 Людмила Таран. «Совкова свідомість жива — її потрібно змінювати» (Зірка МЕНЗАТЮК — про дискусії довкола своєї останньої книжки).

University of Lviv alumni
Ukrainian children's writers
Ukrainian women writers
1954 births
Living people